The 1980 Individual Ice Speedway World Championship was the 15th edition of the World Championship  The Championship was held on 23/24 February 1980 in Kalinin in the Soviet Union.

The winner was Anatoly Bondarenko of the Soviet Union for the second time.

Classification

See also 
 1980 Team Ice Racing World Championship
 1980 Individual Speedway World Championship in classic speedway

References 

Ice speedway competitions
World